Hey, Come On! is the fourth Korean-language studio album by South Korean boy band Shinhwa. It was released on June 28, 2001, by SM Entertainment. As with their past albums, Hey, Come On! was well received by fans and the title track climbed up charts rapidly.  The album's release coincided with the rise of the Korean Wave, spreading the group's popularity overseas. Hey, Come On! spent 28 weeks on the MIAK Chart before it dropped.

Music video
In the music video for "Hey, Come On!", Shinhwa can be seen dancing in a white room. The choreography consists of heavy leg movement as well as members (mostly Jun Jin) jumping around. The music video concentrates heavily on Jun Jin and Lee Min Woo. Towards the end of the music video, we can see Minwoo running towards a wall and jumping into it, causing the "wall" to open. This suggests that perhaps the members were in space, and dancing inside of a white rocket, though it is unclear.

Controversy

Cover disputes against the other Asian groups
Although Hey, Come On! was well received, it garnered much controversy at the time.  Andy Lee didn't participate in their 4th album and it was rumored that he had tried to commit suicide.  However, it was revealed later that he had only left the group to be with his Mother, who was critically ill in the United States.  Another controversy that arose was when Taiwanese boy band Energy covered Shinhwa's song, "Hey, Come On!", calling it "Come On!", causing Shinhwa fans to dislike Energy.  Later, the Taiwanese group 5566 also covered Shinhwa's "Dark".

Credits and personnel 
Information is adapted from the liner notes of Hey, Come On!:

Album production
 Lee Soo-man – producer
 Kat – recording engineer, mixing engineer
 Yeo Doo-hyeon – recording engineer, mixing engineer
 Kim Byeong-jae – recording engineer
 Lee Seong-ho – recording engineer
 Jeon-hoon (Sonic Korea) – mastering engineer

Guitar
 Groovie K – "Reminiscence"
 Hong Joon-ho – "Falling in Love"
 Sam Lee – "Never Can Rewind", " Trippin'", "Dark"
 Jeong Ki-song – "Sure I Know", "I Swear..."

Bass
 Lee Tae-woon – "Reminiscence", "Never Can Rewind", "I Swear..."

Drums
 Kang Soo-ho – "I Swear..."

Piano
 Choi Tae-wan – "Shinhwa Knight"
 Song Kwan-sik – "Trippin'", "I Swear..."

Violin
 Oh Jo-hwan – "Reminiscence", "Never Can Rewind", "Egotism (97年 4月 1日)", "I Swear..."
 Bae Shin-hui – "Never Can Rewind", "Egotism (97年 4月 1日)", "I Swear..."
 Choi Dong-sook – "Never Can Rewind", "Egotism (97年 4月 1日)"
 Mun So-myeong – "Egotism (97年 4月 1日)"
 Song So-ool – "Egotism (97年 4月 1日)"
 Bae Ji-sook – "I Swear..."
 Kim Hyeon-kyeong – "I Swear..."
 Im Jae-young – "I Swear..."
 Kim Hui-young – "I Swear..."
 No Seung-lim – "I Swear..."
 Woo Jin-hui – "I Swear..."
 Jo Se-won – "I Swear..."
 Mun Ji-eun – "I Swear..."

Viola
 Han Soo-hui – "I Swear..."
 Lee Bo-mi – "I Swear..."
 Jo Yoon-young – "I Swear..."

Cello
 Oh Hyo-hwan – "Never Can Rewind", "Egotism (97年 4月 1日)", "I Swear..."

Track listing
Information is adapted from the liner notes of Hey, Come On!:

Charts

Weekly charts

Monthly charts

Year-end charts

Sales

Release history

References

2001 albums
Shinhwa albums
SM Entertainment albums